Bizzariya (also spelled Bazzariya, Bazariyeh or Bizariah) is a Palestinian village in the northern West Bank, located 13.3 kilometers northwest of Nablus at the northernmost point of the Nablus Governorate. It is situated in a valley, having an altitude of 460 meters above sea level. According to the Palestinian Central Bureau of Statistics, Bizzariya had a population of over 2,252 inhabitants in 2007.

Geography
Bizzariya is situated on Mount 'Ilan, which has a summit of 588 meters above sea level. The village's average elevation is 450 meters above sea level. The old core of the village consists of two dunams and mostly contains half-ruined houses, with some more modern homes. The nearest localities are Ramin to the south, Burqa to the southeast, Silat ad-Dhahr to the northeast, al-Attara to the north, Kafr Rumman to the northwest and Anabta to the west.

History
Pottery sherds found in Bizzariya indicate that the village was likely established during the Byzantine era in Palestine (mid-3rd to early 7th century). It was a smaller settlement than a nearby site in Bizzariya's jurisdiction called Khirbet Rujman. Most pottery sherds found Bizzariya date back to the medieval period and the village was a casale (estate) during Crusader rule in the 12th century.

Ottoman era
Bizzariya, like all of Palestine, was incorporated into the Ottoman Empire in 1517.  About 10% of the pottery sherds found in the village date back to this period. In the 1596 Ottoman tax registers, Bizzariya was listed as an entirely Muslim village called "Barazia", and had a population of 26 families and two bachelors. It was located in the nahiya of  Jabal Sami, part of  Sanjak Nablus. The inhabitants paid a fixed tax rate of 33,3% on agricultural products, including wheat, barley, summer crops, olive trees, and goats and/or beehives, in addition to a water mill and occasional revenues, a total of 6,800  akçe.

In 1838, Edward Robinson noted Bizaria on his travels in the region,  and placed  it in the  Wady esh-Sha'ir administrative region, west of Nablus. 

In 1870  Victor Guérin  noted it as a village of about one hundred inhabitants, surrounded by several gardens planted with pomegranate and fig trees.  In 1882  the PEF's Survey of Western Palestine described Bizzaria as a "small hamlet on high ground, with springs to the east."

British Mandate era
In the 1922 census of Palestine, conducted  by the British Mandate authorities,  Bezarieh had a population of 183 Muslims,    increasing in the 1931 census  to 217, still all Muslim, in  42 houses.

In  the 1945 statistics  the population was 320, all Muslims,  with 4,278  dunams of land, according to an official land and population survey. Of this, 357 dunams were plantations and irrigable land, 1,393 were used for cereals, while 52 dunams were built-up land.

Jordanian era
In the wake of the 1948 Arab–Israeli War, and after the 1949 Armistice Agreements, Bizzariya  came under Jordanian rule.

The Jordanian census of 1961 found 530 inhabitants.

Post-1967
Since the Six-Day War in 1967, Bizzariya has been under  Israeli occupation.

After the 1995 accords, 91% of the village land is defined as Area A, while the remaining  9% is defined as Area B.

Demographics
In 1997, Bizzariya had a population of 1,606. Palestinian refugees and their descendants accounted for 7.3% of the population. The village's principal families are Hussein, Salim, Hammad, Naser and 'Odah.

References

Bibliography

External links
   Welcome To Bazzariya
Survey of Western Palestine, Map 11:   IAA, Wikimedia commons 
 Bizzariya Village Profile, Applied Research Institute–Jerusalem (ARIJ)
  Bizzariya  (aerial photo), ARIJ
 Development Priorities and Needs in Bizzariya, ARIJ

Villages in the West Bank
Municipalities of the State of Palestine